Wyllie Halt railway station served the village of Wyllie, in the historic county of Monmouthshire, Wales, from 1932 to 1960 on the Sirhowy Railway.

History
The station was opened on 19 December 1932 by the London, Midland and Scottish Railway. It closed on 13 June 1960.

References

Disused railway stations in Caerphilly County Borough
Railway stations in Great Britain opened in 1932
Railway stations in Great Britain closed in 1960
1932 establishments in Wales
1960 disestablishments in Wales
London, Midland and Scottish Railway